Reckless (stylized in all caps) is the debut studio album by Canadian rapper Nav. It was released on May 18, 2018 by XO Records and Republic Records. The album features guest appearances from Quavo, Travis Scott, Lil Uzi Vert, and Gunna. It features production from Nav himself, Wheezy, Ben Billions, Rex Kudo, Charlie Handsome, Foreign Teck, OZ, and Turbo, among others.

Reckless garnered mixed reviews from critics, praising the album's production and guest features but criticized its lyrical delivery. The album debuted at number eight on the US Billboard 200 and was supported by three singles: "Wanted You", "Freshman List" and "Champion".

Background
Nav commented on the album during an interview with Tim Westwood, detailing that he's more involved than ever in the production process, continuing with the expectation of some big features with "no wack artists".

On April 27, 2018, the album's title was announced via Twitter.

During his night show in Houston, he revealed the album's release date, stating:

The cover art and tracklist for the album was revealed via Instagram on May 16, 2018.

Singles
The album's lead single, "Wanted You" featuring Lil Uzi Vert, was released for digital download on November 3, 2017, which was Nav's 28th birthday. The song was produced by Ben Billions. The music video was released on January 11, 2018. The music video was directed by Rough Sketchz. The song peaked at number 64 on the Billboard Hot 100.

The album's second single, "Freshman List", was released on March 16, 2018. The song was produced by Rex Kudo and Charlie Handsome.

The album's third single, "Champion" featuring Travis Scott, was sent to rhythmic contemporary radio on June 26, 2018.

Critical reception

Reckless received generally mixed reviews from music critics. Alphonse Pierre of Pitchfork stated that "Nav is whining, hiding behind braggadocio and making it an album that brings the listener down to the same place as the should be hitmaker." Online hip hop publication HotNewHipHop commented that "Without any sort of reconciliation with his demons, the album becomes a one-side therapy session and we, the listeners, don't get compensated enough to want to hold his hand as he figures himself out." Yoh Phillips of DJBooth wrote that "the production is solid, the features were solid, but Nav has no redeemable qualities."

Commercial performance
Reckless debuted at number eight on the US Billboard 200 chart, earning 36,000 album-equivalent units with 4,000 in pure album sales in its first week. In its second week, the album dropped to number 24 on the chart. As of March 2019, the album has earned 387,000 album-equivalent units in the United States. The songs from the album has earned over a half-billion on-demand streams. On March 27, 2020, the album was certified gold by the Recording Industry Association of America (RIAA) for combined sales and album-equivalent units of over 500,000 units in the United States.

Track listing
Credits adapted from Tidal.

Notes
 "Just Happened" features background vocals from Bobby Raps.

Personnel
All programming is credited to the producers of each track, except where noted.

Musicians
 DannyBoyStyles – keyboards 
 Nav – keyboards 
 Rex Kudo – keyboards , programming 
 Ben Billions – keyboards 
 Turbo – keyboards 
 Wheezy – programming 

Technical
 DannyBoyStyles – recording 
 Ethan Stevens – recording 
 Jaycen Joshua – mixing 
 Shin Kamiyama – mixing , recording 
 David Nakaji – mixing assistant 
 Iván Jiménez – mixing assistant

Charts

Weekly charts

Year-end charts

Certifications

References

2018 debut albums
Republic Records albums
Nav (rapper) albums
Albums produced by Nav (rapper)
Albums produced by Wheezy